Abraham was a French aircraft manufacturer of the 1930s.

Abraham built a two-seat parasol aircraft, the Abraham Iris.

Aircraft

References

External links
Gallica - Les Ailes (Paris) 1930/05/29 (A10, N467)
Aerofred - Abraham Iris

Defunct aircraft manufacturers of France